Harrison Park is a former baseball ground located in Harrison, New Jersey, a town adjacent to Newark, New Jersey. The ground was home to the Newark Peppers of the Federal League in 1915. The field was also known as "Peppers Park" or "Peps Park".

Location
The ballpark was located within the city limits of Harrison, a block and a half east of the Passaic River and a block and a half west of the former Harrison Hudson and Manhattan Railroad (now PATH) station. Home plate was in the northwest corner. The ballpark was bounded by Middlesex Street [now Angelo Cifelli Drive] (north, third base); South 3rd Street (east, left field); Burlington Avenue (south, right field); and South 2nd Street (west, first base). There were (and are) railroad yards skirting the southeast corner of the property; oil tanks were visible behind the right-center field seating, adjacent to the rail yards. An Otis Elevator Company factory stood across the street to the west, near the river.

Baseball
The stadium had a seating capacity of around 21,000. It was a large ballpark, with dimensions of 375 feet in left, 450 feet to center and 375 feet in right; these dimensions, and the fact that baseball was still in its "dead ball" era, made it difficult to hit for power. Just six home runs were hit in Federal League play in Harrison, and only one left the ballpark, hit by the Peps' Emil Huhn (his only career home run). Huhn would be better known as Fred Toney's catcher in the "double no-hit" game on May 2, 1917, where both Toney and Hippo Vaughn tossed no-hitters through nine innings. A crowd of 26,032 attended the opener on April 16, 1915; subsequent crowds were in the 5,000-10,000 range.

Hal Chase, the "Black Prince of Baseball", was involved in an altercation just outside Harrison Park after a game on Sunday, April 25, 1915. Chase, playing for the Federal League team in Buffalo, came to blows with Newark fan Billy Quinn, who had been heckling Chase. Saloon owner (and former boxer) Patrick McGuigan joined the fray and landed a few blows before police broke up the brawl. Chase was uninjured and played the next two days in Harrison.

After the Federal League disbanded at the end of the 1915 season, the ballpark was home to the minor league Newark Bears of the International League until 1923.

Soccer
Harrison Park also hosted several soccer matches in its day and was the home field of West Hudson A.A. of the National Association Football League for their final few seasons. 

The National Challenge Cup competition (now the Lamar Hunt U.S. Open Cup) twice held its final match there, in 1918 and again in 1923. On May 4, 1918, after a 2–2 draw between the Fall River Rovers and Bethlehem Steel F.C. in Fall River, the replay was held in Harrison on May 19; Bethlehem Steel won, 3–0, in front of a crowd of 10,000. Five years later, on April 1, 1923, local side Paterson F.C. played St. Louis Scullin Steel F.C. to a 2–2 draw in Harrison with 15,000 in attendance. Scullin declined a rematch, however, as much of their roster were also pro baseball players who had joined their teams; Paterson was awarded the Cup by default.

The site of the ballpark is only a few blocks northwest of the present-day Red Bull Arena, home to the New York Red Bulls of Major League Soccer, and was once used as a parking lot for the arena.

Fate
Harrison Park was destroyed by a fire on August 18, 1923. The site of Harrison Park is now home to a luxury apartment building.

References

Sources
Marc Okkonen, The Federal League of 1914-1915: Baseball's Third Major League, SABR, 1989.

External links
Parts of the ballpark shown on a Sanborn map

Harrison, New Jersey
1924 disestablishments in New Jersey
Sports venues demolished in 1924
Defunct sports venues in New Jersey 
Defunct baseball venues in the United States